Shizuoka Daiichi Television (静岡第一テレビ, SDT) is a TV station broadcasting in Shizuoka Prefecture. It is an affiliate of Nippon News Network and Nippon Television Network System.

Stations

Analog Stations

Digital Stations(ID:4)

Programs 

 Marugoto (16:53-17:53[JST])

Rival Stations

External links

Nippon News Network
Mass media in Shizuoka (city)
Television channels and stations established in 1979